This is a comprehensive discography of the Japanese noise musician Masami Akita, best known for his project Merzbow. Since 1980 he has released hundreds of recordings, collaborated with dozens of musicians, contributed over two hundred exclusive tracks to compilations, and made numerous guest appearances on recordings by other artists.

Akita has released recordings on over a hundred independent labels all over the world. Some of the labels which have made multiple releases include: Alchemy, Alien8, Blossoming Noise, Cold Spring, Cuneiform, Dirter Promotions, Extreme, Hydra Head, Important, Mego, Release Entertainment (a sublabel of Relapse), RRRecords, Rustblade, Soleilmoon, Tzadik, and Vivo. In the 1980s, he released five LPs and dozens of homemade cassettes on his own labels Lowest Music & Arts and ZSF Produkt.

Note: Release reissues and compilation tracks taken from albums are not listed. The infobox count includes all aliases.

As Merzbow

Studio albums

Live albums

Compilation albums

Video albums

EPs and singles
{| class="wikitable"
!Year!!Title!!Label!!Note
|-
|1991
|Artificial Invagination
|Vanilla
|rowspan="2"|
|-
|rowspan="3"|1993
|Neo Orgasm
|Vertical
|-
|Rod Drug 93
|The Way Out Sound
|aka The Art of Merzbow
|-
|Nil Vagina for Mice
|Banned Production
|
|-
|rowspan="4"|1994
|White Blues
|Self Abuse
|aka Now
|-
|Electroploitation
|Lunhare and Hax
|
|-
|Music for Man with No Name
|Fusetron and Stuart
|with Cock E.S.P.
|-
|Merzbow / John Goff
|The Way Out Sound
|with John Goff
|-
|rowspan="5"|1995
|Electroknots
|Cold Spring and Dirter
|rowspan="3"|
|-
|Wakantanka / Aboriginie of Anniversary 50 Years After War
|Syntactic
|-
|Music for 'The Dead Man 2: Return of the Dead Man'''
|Robot
|-
|Rectal Grinder|Mangrove
|with Gore Beyond Necropsy
|-
|Whizzerbait|Betley Welcomes Careful Drivers and Oska
|with Tea Culture
|-
|1996
|Red 2 Eyes|V2_Archief
|rowspan="5"|
|-
|1997
|Tint|Vinyl Communications
|-
|1999
|Happenings 1000 Years Time Ago|iDEAL
|-
|2001
|Hummingbird|L.S.D. Organisation
|-
|rowspan="2"|2004
|Mini Cycle / Yoshino Tamago / Yonos Bigfoot|[OHM]
|-
|Oumagatoki|Hypnagogia
|with The New Blockaders
|-
|2005
|Free Piano|Misanthropic Agenda
|with John Wiese
|-
|2006
|Black Bone Part 5|Blossoming Noise
|
|-
|2007
|Walrus / Groon|Hydra Head
|with Boris
|-
|rowspan="2"|2009
|Merzbannon|Tizona
|with Racebannon
|-
|Tempi / Matatabi|Dot Dot Dot Music
|rowspan="6"|
|-
|2011
|ZaRa|licht-ung
|-
|2012
|Ko To No O To|Retort
|-
|2014
|Pulse Vegan|Elevator Bath
|-
|2016
|Dual(i)thm|Rehorn
|-
|2017
|Torus|Jezgro
|-
|2019
|Merzbow i Balázs Pándi|Untimely
|with Balázs Pándi
|-
|2021
|Faltered Pursuit|Sleeping Giant Glossolalia
|with Hyrrokkin
|}

Remix albums

Box sets

Splits

Compilation tracks

Appearances

As Masami Akita
Studio albums

Compilation tracks

Appearances

As 3RENSA
with Duenn and Nyantora
Studio albums

Live albums

As Abe Sada
with S.M.U.T.
EPs and singles

Compilation tracks

As Bustmonsters
with Zev Asher, Shohei Iwasaki, Fumio Kosakai, Masahiko Ohno, Tetsuo Sakaibara, and Yamazaki Maso

EPs and singles

Splits

Compilation tracks

As Flying Testicle
with Zev Asher and Yamazaki Maso

Studio albums

EPs and singles

Compilation tracks

As House Hunt Hussies
Compilation tracks

As Kikuri
with Keiji Haino
Live albums

As Maldoror
with Mike Patton
Studio albums

As MAZK
with Zbigniew Karkowski
Studio albums

Live albums

Video albums

Compilation tracks

Appearances

As Merzbow Null
with Kiyoshi Mizutani, Kazuyuki Kishino, Yuji Okano, and others
Live albums

As Pornoise
Compilation tracks

As Satanstornade
with Russell Haswell. They later released the album Satanstornade'' under their real names.
Live albums

Compilation tracks

As SCUM
Studio albums

Compilation tracks

As Secrets
with Tetsuya Mugishima
Studio albums

Live albums

As Tibeta Ubik
with Kazuyuki Kishino
Live albums

Compilation tracks

As True Romance
with Tetsuo Sakaibara and Toshiyuki Seido
Studio albums

Video albums

Compilation tracks

As Universal Indians
with Tetsuo Sakaibara
Live albums

Forthcoming

References

External links
List of releases at Merzbow Official Site

Merzbow discography at Rate Your Music

Electronic music discographies
Discographies of Japanese artists